Ricardo Montaner is the eponymous debut studio album recorded by Venezuelan singer-songwriter Ricardo Montaner. It was released by TH-Rodven in late 1986 (see 1986 in music). It reached No. 1 on the Billboard Latin Pop Albums chart.

Track listing

Chart performance

See also
List of number-one Billboard Latin Pop Albums from the 1980s

References

1986 debut albums
Ricardo Montaner albums
Spanish-language albums
Rodven Records albums